Sir Winston Churchill, the British statesman, soldier, and writer who served as Prime Minister of the United Kingdom during the Second World War, died on 24 January 1965, aged 90. His was the first state funeral in the United Kingdom for a non-member of the Royal Family since Edward Carson's in 1935. It was the last state funeral until Queen Elizabeth II's on 19 September 2022. The official funeral lasted for four days. Planning for the funeral, known as Operation Hope Not, began after Churchill's stroke in 1953 while in his second term as prime minister. After several revisions due to Churchill's continued survival (mainly because "the pallbearers kept dying", explained Lord Mountbatten), the plan was issued on 26 January 1965, two days after his death.

By decree of Queen Elizabeth II, his body lay in state at Westminster Hall for three days from 26 January. On 30 January, the order of funeral was held at St Paul's Cathedral. From there the body was transported by water along the River Thames to Waterloo station, accompanied by military salutations. In the afternoon he was buried at St Martin's Churchyard at Bladon, the resting place of his ancestors and his brother. Attended by representatives from 120 countries, 6,000 people, and (unusually) by Queen Elizabeth II more than 1,000 police and security personnel, involving nine military bands, 18 military battalions, 16 English Electric Lightning fighter jets of the Royal Air Force, a special boat MV Havengore, and a funeral train hauled by Winston Churchill, homage paid by 321,360 people, and witnessed by over 350 million people, it was the largest state funeral in history. It was remarked "as demonstrating the British genius for public spectacle."

Background and funeral plan

Voted as the greatest Briton in a BBC poll in 2002, Sir Winston Churchill is remembered for leading his country (with the Allies) to victory as Prime Minister of the United Kingdom during the Second World War. In June 1953, during his second term as prime minister, he had a severe stroke at a dinner party at Downing Street. Unknown to his guests, he collapsed and was left partially paralysed. The family kept the incident secret. Among the few who were informed of the news was Queen Elizabeth II, who had occupied the throne for just a year. She instructed the Duke of Norfolk, who, as Earl Marshal, was in charge of state funerals, to make preparations in the event of Churchill's death that should be "on a scale befitting his position in history". A meticulous and confidential plan titled Operation Hope Not was prepared. Churchill survived the next 12 years, during which necessary modifications were frequently made. During that period, in 1958, Churchill nearly died from a sudden attack of pneumonia.

The final documents, titled State Funeral of the Late Sir Winston Leonard Spencer Churchill, K.G., O.M., C.H., were issued on 26 January 1965, two days after Churchill's death. The documents dictated the entire course of the funeral down to the minutest detail.

Death
Churchill died in the morning of Sunday 24 January 1965 in his home at 28 Hyde Park Gate, London, exactly 70 years after the death of his father. Since 1949, he had suffered eight strokes. The last was on 15 January 1965, from which he never recovered. After the stroke, he was mostly in a coma; his last words were to his son-in-law Christopher Soames: "I'm so bored with it all." His physician Lord Moran first informed the Queen and the Prime Minister Harold Wilson of the death, and then made the announcement at 8:35 a.m. which was given to the press, saying, "Shortly after eight this morning, Sunday, Jan the 24th, Sir Winston Churchill died at his London home. [Signed] Moran."

Reactions and tributes
Leading the world in tributes were Queen Elizabeth II, prime minister Harold Wilson, and Lyndon B. Johnson, the president of the United States.

The Queen immediately sent a letter of condolence to Lady Churchill after hearing Churchill's death, saying:

Wilson announced: 

Johnson, hospitalised at Bethesda Naval Hospital with influenza, issued an official statement, saying:

He also ordered flags throughout the United States flown at half-staff to pay tribute to America's first honorary citizen through the day of the funeral. This was also the first time that the American flag was flown at half-staff for a foreign leader.

Other tributes
Other world leaders who joined in the tributes included former British prime ministers Clement Attlee, Anthony Eden, Harold Macmillan, and Sir Alec Douglas-Home, French President Charles de Gaulle, Soviet Premier Alexei Kosygin, former US presidents Harry S. Truman and Dwight D. Eisenhower, and Pope Paul VI.

Authorisation of state funeral 
The Queen sent a message to the House of Commons concerning the procedures for Churchill's funeral, and was read on 25 January, which ran:

When members of the House met to pay tribute, the Prime Minister moved the motion that was a request from the Queen regarding the places for lying in state and funeral service, and was resolved as:

Embalming
J. H. Kenyon Ltd, of Paddington, London, the funeral directors to the Royal Household since 1928, were tasked with preparing Churchill's remains for the funeral. Desmond Henley, the company's chief embalmer, went to Churchill's Hyde Park Gate home to oversee the process. Churchill's body was embalmed in the same room where he had died. When the process was completed, the remains were dressed in his silk pyjamas and dressing gown and placed back into his bed. Churchill lay in repose in private at his home until 9:00 p.m. Tuesday evening when Kenyon's staff transported his remains to Westminster Hall for public viewing.

Funeral programme

Lying in state
The funeral started on Tuesday 26 January 1965. By 8:30 p.m. police and security personnel had taken up their positions in what The Daily Telegraph reported as "the most extensive security operation of this sort ever undertaken in England." At 9:15 p.m. Churchill's body was transported from his London home to Westminster Hall for the lying in state. It was led by Cameron Cobbold, 1st Baron Cobbold, the Lord Chamberlain, in the company of family members. He was placed on a catafalque before Lady Churchill and the Earl Marshal. At 9:00 p.m. the first watch was mounted in the hall by the Grenadier and Coldstream Guards. In the subsequent days the Royal Navy, five regiments of foot guards and the Queen's Royal Irish Hussars also took turns.

The lying-in-state lasted from Wednesday 27 January to 6:00 a.m. on 30 January, during which Westminster Hall was kept open for 23 hours daily. An hour was reserved for cleaning. The queue was most times more than one mile long, and the waiting time was about three hours; 321,360 people came to pay their respects.

Procession
At 9:45 a.m. on Saturday, 30 January, the funeral began with the chiming of Big Ben. The clock was muted for the rest of the day. A ninety-gun salute was fired at Hyde Park to mark the ninety years of Churchill's life. The coffin was carried from the hall by a bearer party of eight guards from the 2nd Battalion Grenadier Guards, placed on a gun carriage and draped with the Union Flag, on which was placed the insignia of the Order of the Garter on a black cushion. The procession started upon a drum beat by the Royal Navy and was then led by the Royal Air Force and the Foot guards. The gun carriage itself was drawn by ninety-eight sailors, with forty more behind holding drag ropes.

Following the gun carriage were Randolph Churchill and his son Winston side by side, followed by male members of the Churchill family and Churchill's private secretary, Anthony Montague Browne, all on foot. Lady Churchill and two daughters followed in the Queen's town coach. As the procession was leaving the New Palace Yard of the Palace of Westminster, a single gunshot was fired at St James's Park. The march processed through Whitehall, Trafalgar Square, the Strand, Fleet Street, and up Ludgate Hill. A marching band consisted of three officers and 96 soldiers of the 2nd Battalion, Scots Guards. Banners of the Danish resistance movements were lowered in respect at the Cenotaph. Altogether 2,500 soldiers and civilians took part in the procession, while four half-companies of soldiers lined the streets. Four majors of the Queen's Royal Irish Hussars were assigned to carry Churchill's medals, orders and decorations. A single gunshot was fired every minute until they arrived at St Paul's.

Entry to St Paul's Cathedral 
The coffin arrived at St Paul's at 10.45 a.m. The pallbearers picked up the coffin from the gun carriage at the west end of the cathedral, and carried it up the 24 steps leading to the entrance. The main pallbearers were eight soldiers of the Grenadier Guards.

There were twelve honorary pallbearers walking in front of the main pallbearers, including Louis Mountbatten, 1st Earl Mountbatten of Burma, the Prime Minister of Australia, Robert Menzies, and the former British Prime Ministers Clement Attlee, Anthony Eden and Harold Macmillan. Aged 82, Attlee was frail with ill-health but insisted he be the pallbearer as Churchill had asked him to do the honour. Walking just in front of the main pallbearers, he stumbled on the steps, making the pallbearers lose their balance, almost dropping the coffin, only being saved by two soldiers, "pushers", from the back.

Order of service
The service began as the coffin was laid in St Paul's Cathedral. With officials from more than 112 countries attending, 3,500 people attended the service, and it was the largest gathering of dignitaries in history until the 1980 funeral of Josip Broz Tito, the 2005 funeral of Pope John Paul II and the 2013 funeral of Nelson Mandela. Guests included the French President Charles de Gaulle, the Canadian prime minister Lester B. Pearson, the prime minister of Rhodesia Ian Smith, former US president Dwight D. Eisenhower, many other past and present heads of state and government, and members of multiple royal families. Churchill had expressly objected to inviting de Gaulle as he believed, although they were allies in the war, he was anti-British and was pleaded with by the Duke of Norfolk on the ground of political amnesty; to which Churchill agreed on the condition that London Waterloo railway station be used instead of Paddington, as planned. Sir Robert Menzies, then the longest-serving Commonwealth Prime Minister, and Eisenhower, both of whom had known Churchill well in wartime, paid tribute on the BBC's broadcast of the funeral. Churchill's favourite hymns were sung, including "Fight the Good Fight", "He Who Would Valiant Be" and "Battle Hymn of the Republic". Choral music was William Croft's Funeral Sentences sung during the entry procession, and the Kontakion of the Departed, "Give rest, O Christ, to thy servant with thy Saints". "Battle Hymn of the Republic" paid tribute to Churchill's American roots, including his honorary US citizenship, his close relationship with the US, particularly his friendship with US president Franklin D. Roosevelt, and his American-born mother. The other two recalled his personality and career.

The (cavalry) Last Post was played by Trumpet Corporal Peter Wilson of the Life Guards with Reveille played by Trumpeter Basil King of the Queen's Royal Irish Hussars. As the service was over at one o'clock, Handel's "Dead March" was played on the organ while the pallbearers were getting ready. The congregation sang "Our God, Our Help in Ages Past" as the coffin was carried out through the Great West Doors.

Menzies and Eisenhower gave their tributes after the funeral, speaking from the cathedral's crypt. Menzies recited:

Eisenhower gave his tribute after Menzies:

Queen Elizabeth II broke certain royal protocols at Churchill's funeral. Firstly, it was a common royal etiquette for the monarch to not attend funeral service outside of the royal family. Secondly, she not only attended the service but was among the first officials to arrive at St Paul's, making her presence even before the coffin and Churchill family arrived. It is a royal custom in any event that the monarch is always the last to arrive. Additionally, it is a royal convention that the monarch is also the first to exit or end an ongoing event. As the funeral service was over, Queen Elizabeth II followed the Churchill family out of the cathedral. To these unusual deeds by Queen Elizabeth II, Nicholas Soames commented: "It is absolutely exceptional if not unique for the Queen to grant precedence to anyone. For her to arrive before the coffin and before my grandfather was a beautiful and very touching gesture." There was a historical precedent however; Queen Elizabeth II's grandfather, George V, had attended the state funeral of Lord Roberts in 1914 and similarly forgone his royal privileges for the occasion.

St Paul's to Bladon

Procession to Tower Pier 
After the church service, Churchill's coffin was carried by a bearer party from the Grenadier Guards to the Tower of London; the journey lasting 18 minutes, making it the longest distance that a coffin had been carried by bearers in any state funeral. Arriving at Tower Hill the procession was led by 60 pipers from the Scots Guards, the Royal Inniskilling Fusiliers and the King's Own Scottish Borderers, playing Scottish laments, and then a Royal Marines band played Sunset on Tower Wharf. The Honourable Artillery Company fired a 19-gun salute, acknowledging Churchill's positions (as head of government and Lord Warden of the Cinque Ports). The procession moved to Tower Pier, where the coffin was taken on board the MV Havengore.

On the River Thames

Aboard MV Havengore, naval ratings 'piped the side' and the Royal Marine band played the musical salute Rule, Britannia! to the former First Lord of the Admiralty. Sixteen Royal Air Force English Electric Lightning fighter jets flew-past in formation as the boat sailed.

As the coffin passed up the River Thames, more than 36 dockers lowered their crane jibs in a salute on the south side of the bank. It was not part of the plan and was initially disapproved by New Scotland Yard as an unnecessary private tribute. The cranes were under the Hay's Wharf (now Hay's Galleria) and the homage was praised as a gesture of respect in an unrehearsed and spontaneous action.

Nicholas Soames, grandson of Churchill, remarked this unexpected activity as one that "undid us all." But when Jeremy Paxman aired his BBC documentary Churchill: A Nation's Farewell in 2015, he created a controversy. In it, Paxman interviewed one of the surviving dockers John Lynch, who claimed that the workers were paid to show up for work and did the gesture only because they were paid to do so as it was a Saturday, their day off. Lynch further went on to say that the dockers hated Churchill. In response, David Freeman reported that way back in 1965, David Burnett, the then managing director of Hay's Wharf, had publicly revealed that the gesture was voluntary. Talking to the Daily Mail, Burnett had stated: "We thought we should add our own little tribute to Sir Winston. The dock workers concerned immediately agreed to give up their time off... Our men have not asked for any overtime. They will be paid something to cover their expenses." Rodney J. Croft also described in his 2014 book Churchill's Final Farewell that the crane drivers voluntarily did the job "without any resort to asking for overtime pay."

Festival Pier to Waterloo Station 
From the MV Havengore, the coffin was borne to a black Austin Princess hearse at Festival Pier by non-commissioned soldiers of the Queen's Royal Irish Hussars in No 2 Dress Uniform. The hearse was escorted only by a large limousine for the Churchill family.

Funeral train 

The coffin arrived at Waterloo Station at 1:23 p.m. and was picked up by ten commissioned officers from the Queen's Royal Irish hussars in No 1 Dress uniform and was placed in a specially prepared funeral train, the locomotive of which was named Winston Churchill that was to carry it to the final destination, Hanborough station in Oxfordshire. The hearse van, No. S2464S, had been set aside in 1962 specifically for the funeral train. In the fields along the route, and at the stations through which the train passed, thousands stood in silence to pay their last respects.

Burial at Bladon
At Bladon, the coffin was carried to St Martin's Churchyard by the officer bearer party of the Queen's Royal Irish Hussars and interred in a private family ceremony. He was laid in a grave near to his parents and his brother.

Observances outside of Britain
There were many memorial services taking place for Churchill outside of Britain during the funeral. For example, in the United States, a memorial service for Churchill took place at FDR's grave at his home in Hyde Park, New York to mark the anniversary of Roosevelt's birth. Those attending the service heard speakers talk about the coincidence of the date in the records of two leaders who shared history. West Point Superintendent Major General James Lampert laid a wreath from President Johnson to pay tribute to both FDR and Churchill.

Dignitaries
Churchill's funeral was the largest gathering of world leaders during the 1960s—and, at that time, in history. Representatives from 112 countries and many organisations attended, including 5 kings, 2 queens, 1 emperor, 1 grand duke, 2 queen consorts, 15 presidents, 14 prime ministers and 10 former leaders. After the funeral, the Queen did another unprecedented gesture in hosting a buffet lunch for all the dignitaries.

Some of the guests were:
 Alfons Gorbach, Chancellor of Austria
 Sir Robert Menzies, Prime Minister of Australia
 Baudouin, King of the Belgians
 Lester B. Pearson, Prime Minister of Canada
 U Thant, Secretary-General of the United Nations
 René Maheu, Director General of UNESCO
 Arnold Smith, Commonwealth Secretary-General
 Jean Rey, President of the European Commission
 Queen Elizabeth II, Prince Philip, Duke of Edinburgh, Prince Charles and Harold Wilson, Prime Minister of the United Kingdom
 Former Prime Ministers Earl Attlee, Earl of Avon, Harold Macmillan, and Sir Alec Douglas-Home 
 Tánaiste Frank Aiken, T.D., Minister for External Affairs of Ireland
 Sir Alexander Bustamante, Prime Minister of Jamaica
 Bahi Ladgham, Prime Minister of Tunisia
 Keith Holyoake, Prime Minister of New Zealand
 Frederick IX, King of Denmark and Jens Otto Krag, Prime Minister of Denmark
 Olav V, King of Norway and Harald, Crown Prince of Norway
 Hans-Peter Tschudi, President of Switzerland
 Giuseppe Saragat, President of Italy
 Urho Kekkonen, President of Finland
 Ludwig Erhard, Chancellor of West Germany
 Walter Ulbricht, Chairman of the State Council of East Germany
 Constantine II, King of the Hellenes, Anne Marie, Queen of the Hellenes, Frederica, Dowager Queen of the Hellenes
 Juliana, Queen of the Netherlands and Bernhard, Prince Consort of the Netherlands
 Foreign Minister Zulfikar Ali Bhutto
 Jean, Grand Duke of Luxembourg
 Michael, King of Romania
 Petar Stambolić, Prime Minister of Yugoslavia
 Archbishop Egidio Vagnozzi, Apostolic Delegate of Vatican City
 Zalman Shazar, President of Israel
 C. R. Swart, State President of South Africa
 Habib Bourguiba, President of Tunisia
 Haile Selassie I, Emperor of Ethiopia
 Tage Erlander, Prime Minister of Sweden
 General Agustín Muñoz Grandes, Deputy Prime Minister of Spain
 Rear Admiral Américo Tomás, President of Portugal
 Ian Smith, Prime Minister of Southern Rhodesia
 Kenneth Kaunda, President of Zambia
 General İsmet İnönü, Prime Minister of Turkey
 Abdelkadir Chanderil, President of Algeria
 Nguyễn Văn Thiệu, President of South Vietnam
 Nobusuke Kishi, Former Prime Minister of Japan
 General Park Chung-hee, President of South Korea
 Diosdado Macapagal, President of the Philippines
 Prince Norodom Kantol, Prime Minister of Cambodia

Delegations
Three countries were permitted to send delegations:

France
Charles de Gaulle, President
Admiral Georges Cabanier, Naval Chief of Staff
Geoffroy Chodron de Courcel, Ambassador to the United Kingdom
Soviet Union
Konstantin Rudnev, Deputy Premier
General Ivan Konev, commander of forces in East Germany
United States
Earl Warren, Chief Justice
David K. E. Bruce, Ambassador to the United Kingdom
Lloyd Hand, Chief of Protocol
W. Averell Harriman, Under Secretary of State
Dwight D. Eisenhower, former president and General of the Army retired
Ten senators, including:
J. William Fulbright, chairman of the Foreign Relations Committee
Bourke Hickenlooper, ranking Republican, Foreign Relations Committee 
Henry M. Jackson

The chief members of the delegation were initially Warren, Secretary of State Dean Rusk, and Bruce. However, while in London, Rusk became ill and so did not attend, resulting in Hand becoming a chief representative.

Prominent absences
Irish President Éamon de Valera wasn't invited, being an outspoken antagonist of Churchill, particularly for the latter's involvement in the partition of Ireland. Upon hearing the death, he praised Churchill as "a great Englishman", while adding that he had also been "a dangerous adversary" for Ireland. He had stirred a controversy as he signed Adolf Hitler's condolence book on 2 May 1945 at the German Embassy in Dublin two days after Hitler's death.

US President Lyndon Johnson did not attend upon the advice of his doctors after hospitalisation for influenza. However, his decision not to send Vice President Hubert Humphrey for no particular reason provoked sharp criticism in newspapers in the US, Britain, and elsewhere abroad. The White House press corps repeatedly questioned Press Secretary George Reedy for an explanation of the absence. Johnson said during a press conference that not sending Humphrey was a "mistake."

Media coverage

News of death
The BBC relayed the news of the death at 9:00 a.m. and continued playing Symphony No. 5 by Beethoven, the opening theme with three short notes and a long note that indicated the letter "V" in Morse code to symbolise Churchill's iconic wartime gesture, two fingers held aloft to show "V" for victory.

Coverage of state funeral
The funeral was watched by 25 million people in the United Kingdom; it was not, however, broadcast live in Ireland. There were 350 million viewers worldwide, making it a record for a television event at the time.

In Britain, the funeral was broadcast live on BBC, presented by Richard Dimbleby, and on ITV with Brian Connell doing the commentary. This would be the last state occasion Dimbleby would present because he died in December that year from cancer.

In North America, which is five to eight hours behind Greenwich Mean Time, the funeral occurred during the time usually taken up by network breakfast television programmes. However, then, the only such programme in the United States was NBC Today, but it wasn't broadcast on Saturdays. Although the funeral took place in the early morning hours in North America, the audience in the United States was larger than JFK's fourteen months before. NBC had the highest ratings among the three networks at the time (ABC, CBS, and NBC) for their live coverage, with Chet Huntley, David Brinkley, and Merrill Mueller (himself a former NBC London bureau chief) presenting the coverage live from London. The networks also carried highlights of the funeral in the evening hours.

Aftermath
As Lady Churchill was retiring to bed she said to her daughter Mary (Lady Soames, Baroness Soames), "It wasn't a funeral, Mary – it was a triumph."

The Scots Guards Battalion Digest reported, stating, "without a doubt the State Funeral of 30 January was the most moving parade that the majority of the battalion had ever taken part in or observed. Perfect timing, detailed rehearsal and greater dignity all combined to make it a proud and wonderful occasion."

The Observer reported on 31 January, saying, "This was the last time that London would be the capital of the world. This was an act of mourning for the imperial past. This marked the final act in Britain's greatness... It was a triumph. It was a celebration of a great thing that we did in the past."

Within a week, more than 100,000 people had visited the grave. In 1998, Churchill's tombstone had to be replaced due to the large number of visitors over the years having eroded it and its surrounding area. A new stone was dedicated in 1998 in a ceremony attended by members of the Spencer-Churchill family.

De Gaulle commented: "Now Britain is no longer a great power."

See also 
 Death and funeral of Margaret Thatcher

References

Inline citations

Bibliography

External links

Original BBC footage of Churchill's funeral
Churchill's Funeral - Order of Service - UK Parliament Living Heritage
Funeral profile at St Paul's
"Churchill's Final Journey" by Railway Museum
Tributes to Churchill on BBC archive

1965 in London
Deaths by person in London
Funerals by person
January 1965 events in the United Kingdom
State funerals in the United Kingdom
Winston Churchill